Elbows Akimbo was an Avant Garde performance art ensemble that emerged from San Francisco's underground scene of the late 1980s and stopped producing work in the mid 1990s.

Originally an outgrowth of San Francisco State University's progressive department: the Center for Experimental and Interdisciplinary Arts, it was founded by director Thomas Schulz, and co-founded by the vocalist, singer/songwriter/composer, actor, poet and writer Diana Rosalind Trimble who was in the same department.

The original group had eleven members, including certain key performers who have gone on to have interesting careers, from Diana Rosalind Trimble , vocalist, composer, writer, and actor; to Michael Calvello, writer and actor; Kalonica McQuesten, vocalist and musician; Kevin McKereghan, sound engineer; dancer, Alisa Froman , Joy Cutler , actor and writer; Nancy Beckman, musician and actor/dancer Jody Ellsworth.

Later additions to the group who have also continued in the performing arts include  actor/writer/director Michael Edo Keane, harpist/composer Barbara Imhoff, vocalist, actor and educator Susan Volkan, illustrator/designer Barron Storey, movement artists Mark Steger , actor/writer Johnna Schmidt, actor/director Charles Herman-Wurmfeld, director Mark Waters, actor Rebecca Klingler, actor John Flanagan, actor/director Diane Jackson, actor/playwright Tanya Shaffer, author Carol Lloyd, Hungarian poet, translator, performance artist Gabor G. Gyukics, actor Salim Abdul-Jelani, and actor Lewis Sims among others.

Productions
In chronological order
Enter the World of Beatrice
Asylum
The Tempest: a Radical Deconstruction
O Flame of Living Love
Carnevale
Bhagavad-Gita: the War Within,
JFK/Marat
At the Speed of Life

and tended to feature meditations on the opposing extremes of mysticism and profanity.

Elbows Akimbo was connected to a web formed by other experimental artists of the time, such as Contraband, Rob Brezny's World Entertainment War, Crash Worship, Nao Bustamante, Paul Benny, Beth Custer, The Beatnigs, Dude Theatre and George Coates Performance Works.

American artist groups and collectives
Arts organizations based in California